Malankara Metropolitan is an ecclesiastical title given to the head of the Malankara Syrian Church, previously by the Government of Travancore and Cochin in South India. This title was awarded by a proclamation from the King of Travancore and the King of Cochin. The Prime jurisdiction regarding the temporal, ecclesiastical and spiritual administration of the Malankara Church is vested in the Malankara Metropolitan. The Malankara Metropolitan is the legal custodian of the Kottayam Old Seminary, interest of Vattipanam and Other Common Community properties of Malankara Church.

After 1877, every denomination in the Malankara Church started claiming their prelate as Malankara Metropolitan. Among them, the head of the Malankara Orthodox Syrian Church was affirmed by the Supreme court of India.

The current Malankara Metropolitan is Baselios Marthoma Mathews III

The title "Mar Thoma Metropolitan" is used by the head of the Mar Thoma Syrian Church since 1894. The current Mar Thoma Metropolitan of Mar Thoma Church is Theodosius Mar Thoma

Lineage
Historically the primate or leader of St Thomas Christians was known as Jathikku Karthavyan (leader of Community), Malankara Moopen (Elder of the Community), Archdeacon or Arkadiyakon (High Priest). This office was traditionally held by the Pakalomattom family. In the 16th century, it became necessary to elevate the Archdeacon to a position of 'Metropolitan Bishop' named as Mar Thoma to resist the Latinization attempts of the Jesuits. In 1653 the Archdeacon position was elevated to Bishopric by laying hands of twelve priests in the absence of a valid Bishop. This was an emergency step. Then onwards, the Metropolitan Bishop assumed the honorific ecclesiastical title Mar Thoma. This title was used from 1653 to 1815. Later a regular 'Bishopric' was established in Malankara with the help of Gregorios Abdal Jaleel.

Title of Malankara Metropolitan
It was when Col. John Munro was the British Resident of Travancore, that Pulikkottil Joseph Ittoop Ramban was ordained as a bishop by Geevarghese Philexenos II (Kidangan) (1811–29) of Malabar Independent Syrian Church (Thozhyoor Church) on 22 March 1815. He was given the episcopal title Dionysius II, as he was the second bishop in the Malankara Church to get this title. After the death of Thoma VIII, he was made the head of the Malankara Church by a Royal proclamation issued by the King of Travancore and later by the King of Cochin. This enabled Dionysius II to dethrone Mar Thoma IX, who was consecrated by Mar Thoma VIII to succeed him. The Royal Proclamation favouring Dionysius II was under the influence of Col.John Munroe. The proclamation insisted every Malankara Syrian Christian of Travancore-Cochin obey the Malankara Metropolitan. From then onwards, the head of the Malankara Church legally came to be known as Malankara Metropolitan. The position of the Malankara Metropolitan in the 19th century is an upgrowth from the position of the previous Thomas and Archdeacons.  The power and authority of the Malankara Metropolitan got more recognition than the power and authority of the previous Archdeacons' and Marthomas' because the British Residents of Travancore were favorably disposed towards the Malankara Church.

From 1816, Dionysius II, Dionysius III, Dionysius IV and Mathews Athanasius were successive Malankara Metropolitans. However, inspired and encouraged by the Anglican missionaries who had taught at the old seminary in Kottayam, Mathews Athanasius wanted to reform the traditional Syrian church. A parallel group under Dionysius V was working against his reformational schemes. During the latter half of the 19th century there occurred two factions in the community; the minority faction that favored reformation and the majority faction who were against it. Dionysius V of the (Syrian traditionalists; invited and brought Ignatius Peter IV of Antioch to Malankara in 1875. The Patriarch divided the Malankara church into seven dioceses; Dionysius V was declared as the Malankara Metropolitan and was given charge of Quilon Diocese in the synod of Mulanthuruthy (27 to 30 June 1876). Neither the incumbent Metropolitan Mathews Athanasius nor the Churches favoring him participated in the synod.

A series of court cases followed thereafter. The Travancore Royal court, by order on 14 July 1889 declared that Dionysius V because of keeping the orthodox faith and acceptance by the majority of Malankara Syrians, is the rightful Malankara Metropolitan and Thomas Athanasius has no rights or claims to that office. Thus the reformed faction separated and organized themselves as the independent Mar Thoma Syrian Church. The majority faction that kept Oriental Orthodox faith came under the leadership of the new Malankara Metropolitan Dionysius V, under the spiritual guidance of the Patriarch of Antioch is known as the Malankara Orthodox Syrian Church (Malankara Church).

In 1911, the church was divided into two factions due to internal disputes. Since then the faction that supported the Patriarch of Antioch was known as Bava Kakshi (Patriarch faction)  and Methran Kakshi (bishop faction) or Malankara orthodox who supported Vattasseril Thirumeni(bishop) later Methran Faction(Malankara Orthodox Syrian Church) ordained Catholicos in 1912 by excommunicated Patriarch Ignatius Abded Mshiho II creating fear in the Malankara Church that he would attempt to take control of the church, reversing the decisions of the Council of Mulanthuruthy in 1876. There were several years of litigation between the two factions, the Metran faction, and the Bava faction. The Supreme court of India declared that the Patriarch has no power in Malankara Church and his spiritual power had also come to vanishing point since the establishment of Catholicate. This caused the Malankara Church to split again. Patriarch faction under the Patriarch of Antioch who still believes in the spiritual powers of the Patriarch and remains under the Maphrian / Catholicos of the Syriac Orthodox Church, later established Catholicos of India.

Malankara Orthodox Syrian Church: Headed by Malankara Metropolitan and Catholicos of the East seated on the Apostolic See of Saint Thomas

Electing Catholicos Geevarghese II as Malankara Metropolitan
After the death of Malankara Metropolitan Geevarghese Dionysius VI of Vattasseril (1934), the Malankara Association held at M.D Seminary Kottayam elected Catholicos Baselios Geevarghese II as the Malankara Metropolitan and passed a constitution for Malankara Orthodox Syrian Church popularly known as 1934 CONSTITUTION or Malankara Orthodox Syrian Church Constitution.
 
Since 1934, the Catholicos of the East is holding the Office of Malankara Metropolitan.

Malankara Association 2002 at Parumala
According to Supreme Court order, the Malankara Syrian Christian Association (Parliament of the Malankara church) was conducted under the observation of Supreme Court of India in order to set right the position of Malankara Metropolitan Catholicos Baselios Mar Thoma Mathews II.

The Association Meeting held on 20 March 2002 at Parumala Seminary elected Baselios Mar Thoma Mathews II as the Malankara Metropolitan. The secret ballot voting was conducted at the Seminary and the result was declared by the Supreme Court Observer Justice V.S. Mulimud. The total polling was 3483 votes. Out of these, 3464 votes were cast in favour of Baselios Mathews II, 10 voted against and 9 were invalid. The total delegates registered for the Association was 3528., "The supreme authority of the Malankara Syrian Christian Association has been unambiguously approved by the Supreme Court. The factions no longer exist and there is only one official Malankara Church." The election was held as per the Supreme Court's 1995 judgement on the dispute in the Malankara church.

However, this meeting  was boycotted by the Patriarch faction, who were not happy with its overall conduct.

Thronal Cathedral 
From 1653 to 1815, the See of Malankara Metropolitan was located at individual churches of the incumbent's preference. These include primarily Niranam Church, along with Kandanad Church, Kadampanad Church, etc. at various times during that period. As the headquarters of the Malankara Metropolitan was moved to Kottayam with the establishment of the Orthodox Theological Seminary, Kottayam in 1815, the thronal cathedral was also relocated to the most prominent church in Kottayam at the time, Kottayam Cheriapally. Since then, Kottayam Cheriapally has remained the thronal cathedral of Malankara Metropolitans.

Headquarters 
Similar to the thronal cathedral, the headquarters of the Malankara Metropolitan was also located at individual churches of the incumbent's preference from 1653 to 1815. With the establishment of the Orthodox Theological Seminary, Kottayam in 1815, the headquarters was permanently relocated to the Seminary.

See also
Orthodox Theological Seminary, Kottayam
List of Malankara Metropolitans

References

Sources

External links
 Ordinations, Demises etc. of Malankara Church leaders at Niranam Valiyapally
 Official website of Malankara Metropolitan and Malankara Church
 Official Malankara Orthodox Web TV
 MOSC Online News Media
 Malankara Orthodox/Baselius College Radio

1653 establishments in Portuguese India
Syriac Christianity
Saint Thomas Christians